James Grafton Spencer (September 13, 1844 – February 22, 1926) was a U.S. Representative from Mississippi.

Biography
Born near Port Gibson, Mississippi, Spencer attended private schools and Oakland College in 1861.
During the Civil War enlisted in the Confederate States Army as a private in Cowan's battery of Light Artillery.
He served until the close of the Civil War in the Army of Mississippi and in the Army of Tennessee.
He returned to his home and engaged in agricultural pursuits.
He served as member of the State house of representatives 1892–1894.

Spencer was elected as a Democrat to the Fifty-fourth Congress (March 4, 1895 – March 3, 1897).
He engaged in the real estate and insurance business.
He died in Port Gibson, Mississippi, February 22, 1926.
He was interred in Wintergreen Cemetery.

References

1844 births
1926 deaths
People from Port Gibson, Mississippi
Confederate States Army personnel
People of Mississippi in the American Civil War
Democratic Party members of the Mississippi House of Representatives
Democratic Party members of the United States House of Representatives from Mississippi